The Tajikistan Support Project (TSP) Foundation (TSP), founded in 1999, is a small Dutch foundation that aims to support health care organisations in Tajikistan with knowledge and network building, small transportations of goods and financial support.

External links
 Official website

Healthcare in Tajikistan
Health charities in the Netherlands
Development charities based in the Netherlands
Foreign charities operating in Tajikistan